The Lancer 36 FR (Fractional Rig) is an American sailboat that was designed by Bill Lee as a cruiser and first built in 1982.

The Lancer 36 FR is a development of the Lancer 36, with the fractional rig designed by Bruce Farr. The Lancer 36 FR was originally marketed by the manufacturer as the Lancer 36, but is now usually referred to as the Lancer 36 FR to differentiate it from the 1973 design from which it was derived.

Production
The design was built by Lancer Yachts in the United States from 1982 until 1985, but it is now out of production.

Design
The Lancer 36 FR is a recreational keelboat, built predominantly of fiberglass, with wood trim. It has a fractional sloop rig, a raked stem, a reverse transom, an internally mounted spade-type rudder controlled by a wheel and a fixed fin keel. It displaces  and carries  of ballast.

It is fitted with an inboard diesel engine for docking and maneuvering.

The design has sleeping accommodation for six people, with two straight settees in the main cabin and two aft cabins with double berths. The galley is located on the port side just forward of the companionway ladder. The galley is equipped with a two-burner stove and a sink. A navigation station is opposite the galley, on the starboard side. The head is located just aft of the bow storage area.

For sailing downwind the design may be equipped with a symmetrical spinnaker.

See also
List of sailing boat types

References

Keelboats
1980s sailboat type designs
Sailing yachts
Sailboat types built in the United States
Sailboat type designs by Bill Lee
Sailboat types built by Lancer Yachts